Thomas Meigh (6 June 1899 – 1972) was an English professional footballer who played as an inside forward.

Career statistics
Source:

References

1899 births
1972 deaths
Footballers from Stoke-on-Trent
English footballers
Association football inside forwards
Hanley Town F.C. players
Wrexham A.F.C. players
Port Vale F.C. players
English Football League players